Calliotropis eltanini is a species of sea snail, a marine gastropod mollusk in the family Eucyclidae.

Description
The length of the shell reaches 14.1 mm.

Distribution
This species occurs off the South Shetland Islands at a depth of 900 m.

References

 Engl W. (2012) Shells of Antarctica. Hackenheim: Conchbooks. 402 pp.

External links

eltanini
Gastropods described in 1990